Syndesinae is a subfamily of stag beetles in the family Lucanidae. There are at least two genera and four described species in Syndesinae.

Genera
These two genera belong to the subfamily Syndesinae:
 Ceruchus MacLeay, 1819 i c g b
 Sinodendron Hellwig, 1791 i c g b
Data sources: i = ITIS, c = Catalogue of Life, g = GBIF, b = Bugguide.net

References

Further reading

 
 
 
 
 
 
 
 
 
 
 
 
 

 
Lucanidae